The 2015–16 season was Chesterfield's 149th season in their history and their second consecutive season in League One. Along with League One, the club also competed in the FA Cup, League Cup and Football League Trophy. The season covers the period from 1 July 2015 to 30 June 2016.

Transfers

Transfers in

Transfers out

Loans in

Loans out

Competitions

Pre-season friendlies
On 18 May 2015, Chesterfield announced two pre-season friendlies against Matlock Town and Belper Town. On 27 May 2015, a friendly against Hartlepool United was announced. A pre-season friendly against Hull City was confirmed on 9 June 2015. A sixth friendly against Buxton was confirmed on 19 June 2015. On 22 June 2015, Chesterfield announced Burnley will visit on 25 July 2015.

League One

League table

Matches
On 17 June 2015, the fixtures for the forthcoming season were announced.

FA Cup

League Cup
On 16 June 2015, the first round draw was made, Chesterfield were drawn away against Carlisle United.

Football League Trophy
On 5 September 2015, the second round draw was shown live on Soccer AM and drawn by Charlie Austin and Ed Skrein. Chesterfield were drawn against Rochdale.

References

Chesterfield F.C. seasons
Chesterfield